Raphael Draccon (born Raphael Albuquerque Pereira, June 15, 1981) is a Brazilian fantasy and fiction writer and screenwriter awarded by the American Screenwriters Association. He is considered one of the most influential and bestselling fiction writers of the current literary market in Brazil reaching number one book at Amazon best-seller list and Submarino sites. Aside from having already signed one of the largest publishers in the country, Draccon was an editor and had his own imprint at Leya called Fantasy – Casa da Palavra from 2013 to 2015.

He wrote the bestselling High fantasy trilogy Dragons of Ether (in Portuguese, Dragões de Éter), originally published on the Lusophone markets (Brazil and Portugal) between 2009 and 2013, in which he retells fairy tales in a more "pop" version. He published the dark fantasy book Espíritos de Gelo (Spirits of Ice) in Latin America and Iberia (in Portugal the work was published by Gailivro – Dom Quixote publisher) and launched the Fios de Prata – Reconstruindo Sandman ("Silver Cords – Rebuilding Sandman") which appeared in a major soap opera.

Draccon was part of the original editing team of the George R. R. Martin's A Song of Ice and Fire bestseller series by Leya publisher in Brazil. In 2013 got the 4th place in the best-seller list of Mexico (Random House Mondadori) and the bestseller Brazilian writer Paulo Coelho quoted his name in Frankfurt Book Fair, in Frankfurt am Main, Germany. He signed a trilogy with Rocco where he already published Cemitérios de Dragões (Cemeteries of Dragons) reaching the best-seller list and was the second best-seller book of Rocco Publishers in the São Paulo City Book Fair. He sold a nerdy comedy script for Dama films, owned by Carol Kotscho that is their next movie. After that got signed with the Latin American television network sector giant Rede Globo and was invited to write their next TV Series, Supermax.

Since 2015 Raphael Draccon is based in Los Angeles, California where he lives with his wife, the also Brazilian fiction writer Carolina Munhóz.

He signed two Netflix original TV Series: The Chosen One (TV series), where he is the writer and co-executive producer from both seasons, and Invisible City (TV series), a series based on a story developed by him and where he is also a consulting producer.

Draccon is represented by CAA and The Gotham Group.

Published works 
 Dragons of Ether – WitchHunter (2007) – Brazil (Leya), Portugal (Dom Quixote) and Mexico (Random House Mondadori).
 Dragons of Ether – SnowHearts (2009) – Brazil (Leya), Portugal (Dom Quixote) and Mexico (Random House Mondadori).
 Dragons of Ether – RainCircles (2010) – Brazil (Leya), Portugal (Dom Quixote) and Mexico (Random House Mondadori).
 Silver Cords – Rebuilding Sandman (2012) – Brazil (Leya)
 Spirits of Ice (2012) – Brazil (Leya)
 Cemeteries of Dragons – Ranger Legacy I (2014) – Brazil (Rocco)
 Cities of Dragons – Ranger Legacy II (2015) – Brazil (Rocco)
 Worlds of Dragons – Ranger Legacy III (2016) – Brazil (Rocco)
 Colector of Spirits (2016) – Brazil (Rocco)

TV series 
 Supermax (TV series) (2016) - Rede Globo
 The Chosen One (TV series) (2019) - Netflix
 Invisible City (TV series) (2020) - Netflix

References 

1981 births
Brazilian male writers
Brazilian screenwriters
Writers from Rio de Janeiro (city)
Living people
Brazilian science fiction writers